Mina Jafari (Persian: مینا جعفری) is an Iranian chorister. She began her work with Tehran Symphony Orchestra  and went on to be part of several important choirs like National Orchestra Choir and Damour Vocal Band. Her work as a female singer in Iran was groundbreaking at the time, she and her choir performed in national TV which was dubbed "breaking yet another taboo" by the media because women are not allowed to sing in Islam. Her performance made way for more female choirs to perform in national TV.

She was part of the Avaye Mahan choir in Asia Pacific Choir Games 2017 in Sri Lanka and performed with Tehran Symphony Orchestra in Italy.

Her Album with Damour Vocal Band is released internationally and ever since her taboo breaking performance she has performed in Iranian national TV with different choirs.

External links 
 Personal Website

References 

Living people
Year of birth missing (living people)